The Port Fairy Football Club, nicknamed the Seagulls, is an Australian rules football and netball club based in the coastal town of Port Fairy, Victoria. The club teams currently compete in the Hampden Football Netball League, with its football squad having played there since 1949.

Premierships
 Warrnambool District Football Association (1900–1923)
 1902, 1904, 1922
 Western District Football League (1924–1933)
 1925, 1926, 1928, 1929
 Port Fairy Football League (1924–1948)
 1924, 1930, 1935, 1940, 1946, 1947
Hampden Football Netball League (1949–current)
1958

Maskell Medallists
George Swarbrick 1958 & 1959
Gary Hiscox 1967
Les Gibb 1969
Kevin Leske 1975
Maurice O'Keefe 1984
Michael Taylor 1986

Notable players
VFL/AFL players recruited from Port Fairy include:
Scott Crow (Hawthorn/Collingwood)
Ted Llewellyn (Geelong/North Melbourne)
Noel Mugavin (Fitzroy/Richmond)
Jim Warren (Geelong)

Bibliography 
 Evergreen Hampden: The Hampden Football League and its people, 1930-1976 by Fred Bond & Don Grossman, 1979 – 
 History of Football in the Western District by John Stoward – Aussie Footy Books, 2008 –

References

External links

 Twitter site
 SportsTG site

Hampden Football League clubs
Netball teams in Victoria (Australia)
Sports clubs established in 1868
1868 establishments in Australia